Waleed Al-Hubaishi (born 2 January 1993) is a Yemeni footballer who plays for Al-Saqr SC.

Honours 
Al-Ahli Taizz S.C.
Runners-up
 Yemeni Super Cup: 2013

External links 
 

1993 births
Living people
Yemeni footballers
Yemen international footballers
Association football defenders
Al-Ahli Taizz SC players
Al-Saqr SC players
Yemeni League players